The 2015–16 Lebanese Premier League is the 55th season of top-tier football in Lebanon. A total of twelve teams are competing in the league, with Al Ahed the defending champions.

Teams 
Tadamon Sour and Al Akhaa Al Ahli were relegated to the second level of Lebanese football after ending the 2014–15 season in the bottom two places. They were replaced by Hekmeh FC and Al Egtmaaey Tripoli who won promotion from the second tier.  Six of the twelve member clubs play in the country's capital, Beirut.

Stadia and locations

Table

League table

Top goalscorers

References

2015–16 Lebanese Premier League
Lebanese Premier League seasons
1
Leb